Last of the Summer Wine's third series originally aired on BBC1 between 27 October 1976 and 24 December 1976. All episodes from this series were written by Roy Clarke and produced by Sydney Lotterby Five episodes were directed by Sydney Lotterby but two: the two-parter, "The Great Boarding House Bathroom Caper" and "Cheering Up Gordon", were directed by Ray Butt.

Although none of the episodes from series 3 made it into the top ten programmes of the week on their initial screening, a repeat showing of the final episode, "Isometrics and After," attracted 15 million viewers during a repeat screening in spring 1977. Also notable was the inclusion for the first time of a two-part episode consisting of "The Great Boarding House Bathroom Caper" and "Cheering Up Gordon," both featuring guest appearances by Philip Jackson as Compo's nephew, Gordon.

Blake Butler reprises his role from the first series as the librarian, Mr. Wainwright, before departing the show again at the end of the year. The most notable change this season, however, was the addition of Brian Wilde as the new third-man of the trio, Foggy Dewhurst, an ex-military sign painter. Wilde would play this role twice: between 1976 and 1985 and then again from 1990 until 1997, when he was forced to leave due to health problems.

The third series was released on DVD in region 2 as a combined box set with series 4 on 26 July 2004. A box set featuring just series 3 was released for region 1 on 11 March 2008.

Outline
The trio in this series consisted of:

First appearances

Foggy Dewhurst (1976–1985, 1990–1997)

List of episodes
{| class="wikitable plainrowheaders" style="width:100%;"
|- align=center style="background-color: #DEDDE2F5EF78; font-weight: bold;"
| No. || No. inseries || Title || Directed by || Original airdate || Prod. code || Disc

|}

DVD release
The box set for series 3 and 4 was released by Universal Playback in July 2004.

Notes

References

External links

Series 3 at the Internet Movie Database

Last of the Summer Wine series
1976 British television seasons